Eurystratiomyia is a genus of flies in the family Lauxaniidae.

Species
Eurystratiomyia epacrovitta Gaimari, 2010
Eurystratiomyia erwini Gaimari, 2010

References

Lauxaniidae
Lauxanioidea genera
Diptera of South America